Hugh Alfred Anderson (26 November 1867 – 16 June 1933) was an Ulster Unionist Party activist who was Member of Parliament for North Londonderry from the general election of 14 December 1918 until 13 February 1919. He resigned only three days after taking the parliamentary oath, becoming one of the shortest serving MPs ever. Anderson was the election agent for Hugh T. Barrie, who had represented North Londonderry since 1906 and won the by-election caused by Anderson's resignation. The only reason Barrie had not stood in 1918 was that he was then High Sheriff of County Londonderry and was worried that might be considered an office of profit disqualifying him from the Commons.

References

Sources

Citations

1867 births
1933 deaths
Members of the Parliament of the United Kingdom for County Londonderry constituencies (1801–1922)
Ulster Unionist Party members of the House of Commons of the United Kingdom
UK MPs 1918–1922